is the first opening theme of the anime series of the same name. Composed by Yoko Kanno, the song was originally performed by AKINO. After its release and subsequent re-release for the Genesis of Aquarion pachinko game, it became very popular in Japan and was awarded the silver medal in the JASRAC awards for 2008. Its initial release resulted in a peak at #22 on the Oricon's weekly charts.

The song was successful digitally, and was certified as a triple platinum cellphone download, double platinum ringtone and gold PC download by the RIAJ in April 2011.

Track list
 – 4:44
 – 4:35
"Genesis of Aquarion (Little Mix)" – 1:01
"Genesis of Aquarion (Instrumental)" – 4:42

Re-release

In 2007, the song was re-arranged and re-released for the use in the commercials for the Sankyo CR Fever Genesis of Aquarion pachinko game as sung by members of the cast. An EP with this version was first released digitally to the iTunes Store on October 10, 2007, and included versions of "Go Tight!" and "Kōya no Heath" sung by cast members. A CD single was later released on November 7, 2007, containing the version of "Genesis of Aquarion" sung by the cast members and was also later put on the iTunes Store. This version peaked at #14 on the Oricon Singles Weekly Charts and was eventually certified as the #189 song for 2008. In the re-released CD, AKINO is credited as "AKINO from bless4".

iTunes Store EP track list

"Genesis of Aquarion" – 4:42
Apollo (Takuma Terashima), Silvia (Yumi Kakazu), Hong Lihua (Sanae Kobayashi)
"Go Tight! (Element Gattai Ver.)" – 4:39
Apollo (Takuma Terashima), Silvia (Yumi Kakazu), Hong Lihua (Sanae Kobayashi)
 – 5:40
Rena (Hiromi Satō)

CD single track list

"Genesis of Aquarion (Element Gattai Ver.)" – 4:45
"Genesis of Aquarion (Original Ver.)" – 4:45
Akino (credited as "AKINO from bless4")
"Genesis of Aquarion (Instrumental)" – 4:44
This track is not included in the iTunes release of the single.

Other versions
For the first Genesis of Aquarion soundtrack, AKINO performed the song with her older brother Akashi on backing vocals titled . For the second soundtrack, AKINO, with the rest of bless4 on backing vocals (and credited as the lyricists), performed an a cappella/piano/gospel style version of the song with English lyrics written by the group titled "Genesis of Aquarion" (always written in the English alphabet). This version was included as a bonus track on her debut album Lost in Time. Live performances of the song are often a mix between an acapella arrangement of the predominantly English version ("Genesis of Aquarion") before the music begins for the Japanese version ("").

Cover versions
Yoko Ishida performed a cover version to include on her Hyper Yocomix 2 album. Masaaki Endoh also performed a cover version which was included on his first Enson cover album. The group m.o.v.e also covered the song for their anim.o.v.e. 01 album. The song was also covered for Konami's Guitar Freaks and Drummania series of games.

The song was covered in the mobile rhythm game BanG Dream! Girls Band Party! by the group Poppin'Party featuring voice actress Aina Aiba of Roselia.

References

External links
Genesis of Aquarion discography

2005 singles
2007 singles
Anime songs
Genesis of Aquarion
2005 songs
Songs written by Yoko Kanno
Victor Entertainment singles